Shanghe County is under the administration of Jinan, the capital of Shandong province, People's Republic of China.

Administrative divisions
As 2012, this county is divided to 2 subdistricts, 5 towns and 5 townships.
Subdistricts
Xushang Subdistrict
Yuhuangmiao Subdistrict

Towns

Townships

Climate

References

External links
 Official home page

Shanghe
Jinan